West Milton is a census-designated place located in Kelly and White Deer Townships in Union County in the state of Pennsylvania. The community is located directly across the West Branch Susquehanna River from the borough of Milton which is located in Northumberland County, from which West Milton derived its name. West Milton is located along U.S. Route 15, a few miles south of the community of New Columbia. Between Milton and West Milton, in the river is Montgomery Island where Milton State Park is located. As of the 2010 census the population was 900 residents.

References

Census-designated places in Union County, Pennsylvania
Census-designated places in Pennsylvania